Actibacterium is a Gram-negative and aerobic genus of bacteria from the order of Hyphomicrobiales with one known species (Acuticoccus yangtzensis). Acuticoccus yangtzensis has been isolated from water from the Yangtze in China.

References

Hyphomicrobiales
Bacteria genera
Monotypic bacteria genera